The Scott Mission is a Christian non-denominational charity organization in Ontario, Canada, providing services to poor, homeless, and vulnerable people. The mission is based in downtown Toronto and aims to offer practical, emotional, and spiritual support for thousands of people each year.

Morris Zeidman, an ordained Presbyterian minister who was born in Częstochowa, Poland, and converted to Christianity from Judaism, founded The Scott Mission with his wife Anne in 1941. It was their belief that the hunger of the soul needed to be addressed as well as the hunger of the physical body.

Services

The Scott Mission has two locations in Toronto.  At 502 Spadina Avenue, the Mission offers hot meals, free bag lunches, overnight shelter for 45-50 men each night, shower and laundry facilities, a food and clothing bank, Bible study groups, and fellowship activities. The Mission opened the O'Connor Family Centre in May 2013, at 1550 O'Connor Drive, designed to serve families in the east end of Toronto.  They offer a Christian Childcare Centre, food and clothing bank, youth programs, and a variety of resources for families.

The Mission also has a lodge in Collingwood, Ontario, that is used as a retreat centre away from the city.

The group owns a  campground in Caledon, Ontario, about a 45-minute drive north of Toronto. In the summer, around 600 children and youth from low-income neighbourhoods attend The Scott Mission's camp.

Funding
The Mission spends about $8,000,000 per year, including capital projects. This covers the cost for 160 full-time and part-time staff plus all of the costs associated with providing services for tens of thousands of needy people every year.

The Mission is funded through three main sources: donations from private individuals, businesses and foundations; bequest income; and investment income. Less than 10 per cent of the Mission’s revenues come from government.

See also
Homelessness in Canada

References

External links
 

Christian charities
Charities based in Canada
Homeless shelters in Canada
Organizations based in Toronto
Organizations established in 1941